Aditya Dole (born 9 October 1987) is an Indian cricketer. He played the different formats of First-class cricket, List A cricket and T20 for the Maharashtra cricket team and Rajasthan Royals from 2006 to 2010.

References

External links
 

1987 births
Living people
Indian cricketers